Asakusa Kid is a 2021 Japanese film written and directed by Gekidan Hitori and starring Yo Oizumi and Yuya Yagira. It is a biopic based on the apprenticeship of Takeshi Kitano by Senzaburo Fukami, and adapted from Kitano's 1988 memoir of the same name.

Cast 
 Yo Oizumi as Senzaburo Fukami
 Yuya Yagira as Takeshi Kitano (Beat Takeshi)
 Mugi Kadowaki as Chiharu
 Nobuyuki Tsuchiya as Beat Kiyoshi
 Ayumu Nakajima
 Yūsuke Furusawa
 Nana Komaki
 Yōko Ōshima
 Hiroyuki Onoue as Hachiro Azuma
 Morio Kazama as Jun Tayama
 Honami Suzuki as Mari Fukami

References

External links
 
 

2021 biographical drama films
Japanese drama films
Japanese biographical films
Japanese-language Netflix original films
Takeshi's Castle